John Coghlan (born 6 January 1989) is an Irish sportsperson.  He plays hurling with his local club Moyne–Templetuohy and with the Tipperary senior inter-county team.

Career
Coghlan won an All-Ireland Minor Hurling medal with Tipperary in 2007, and an All-Ireland Under 21 Hurling Championship medal in 2010. He also won a Munster Under-21 Football Championship winners medal in 2010 with Tipperary, their first ever title.

He made his senior Tipperary hurling debut in the fourth round of the league on 13 March 2011, coming on at half time against Offaly in a 1-20 to 0-10 win.
He made his Championship debut against Clare in the 2011 Munster Senior Hurling Championship on 19 July 2011, coming on as a substitute for Paul Curran in the last minute in a 4-19 to 1-19 win.

Honours

Tipperary 
All-Ireland Minor Hurling Championship:
Winner (1): 2007
Munster Minor Hurling Championship:
Winner (1): 2007
Munster Under-21 Hurling Championship:
Winner (1): 2010
All-Ireland Under 21 Hurling Championship:
Winner (1): 2010

References

External links
 Tipperary GAA Player Profiles

Living people
Tipperary inter-county hurlers
Moyne-Templetuohy hurlers
1989 births